"Break My Stride" is a song performed by American recording artist Matthew Wilder. It was released in October 1983 as the lead single from his debut album, I Don't Speak the Language, and became a major worldwide hit single for him in late 1983 and spring 1984, reaching number five on the Billboard Hot 100 and number two on the Cash Box Top 100.

The song has been covered by many artists throughout the years, including Unique II in 1996 and Blue Lagoon in 2004 (whose versions both charted highly in various places) and, in interpolations, Puff Daddy with his 1997 hit "Can't Nobody Hold Me Down" and Aaron Carter on the song "Stride (Jump on the Fizzy)" from his 2001 album Oh Aaron. In 2009 it was interpolated by Matisyahu in the song "Jerusalem".

Composition

Industry executive Clive Davis signed Wilder to Arista Records in 1981 or 1982, but Wilder was not getting the results he or the producers wanted with finding the style of music that worked for him. Poor and near the end of a frustrating period with the record label, he recorded "Break My Stride" on his own dime in the early hours of the morning at the studio of producer Spencer Proffer. "My relationship with Clive Davis was precisely the impetus for my writing the song. There are lyrics in there that are indirectly referring to the circumstances that were governing my life at that point," said Wilder. They threw a party after the recording, and had the music production team sing the chorus, which can be heard at the end of the song. However, Davis did not see potential in the song or any of the others, and his label let Wilder go. Since Arista had not paid Wilder for any of the songs, he was free to shop them around.

Wilder managed to connect with record promoter Joe Isgro, who had a history of doing legally questionable things to promote and chart certain songs. Isgro released "Break My Stride" off his new record label, Private-I, and created the illusion that it was a massive hit, prompting other radio stations to start playing the song, and propelling Wilder's single into the top 5 of the US Billboard charts.

Matthew Wilder version

Personnel

Matthew Wilder – lead and backing vocals, Prophet-5
Bill Elliott – Prophet-5
Dennis Herring – guitar
Peter Bunetta – Oberheim DMX
John Gilston – Simmons drum programming
Greg Prestopino – backing vocals
Joe Turano – backing vocals

Track listings

 7" single
 "Break My Stride" — 3:05
 "Break My Stride" (instrumental) — 3:05

 12" single 
 "Break My Stride" (Remix / Club Version) — 5:10
 "Break My Stride" (Dub Version) — 4:02

Chart performance
Included on his 1983 album, I Don't Speak the Language, the single went to number five on the US Billboard Hot 100 and number four in the UK in January/February 1984. On the US Cash Box chart, Wilder's single reached the number two position, where it remained for two weeks in early February.

A remix version reached the top 20 on the dance chart, and the song additionally hit the Billboard Hot Black Singles chart, staying there for four weeks. Though "Break My Stride" was Wilder's only UK hit, he also reached the US pop chart with his next two singles, "The Kid's American" (#33) and "Bouncing Off the Walls" (#52), before turning to behind-the-scenes work on other artists' recordings.

Charts and certifications

Weekly charts

Year-end charts

Certifications

Unique II version

In 1996, Austrian duo Unique II had its most successful hit by covering "Break My Stride". This dance version of the song was the first international success for the band, peaking at number-one in Austria and New Zealand, and at number 2 in Australia. The single also charted in Ireland, Italy, Canada and Scandinavia.

Critical reception
Larry Flick from Billboard wrote, "Yep, this is a dance-leaning cover of the Matthew Wilder '80s pop chestnut. It has already saturated radio airwaves throughout Europe, with a number of programmers here already giving it positive feedback. Highly videogenic Viennese songbird Jade Davies chirps her way through the track's Ace of Base-like reggae-inflected groove with engaging energy. She'll have little to no trouble successfully carrying this one into the hearts of folks who prefer familiarity over adventure." Australian music channel Max placed the song at number 903 in their list of 1000 Greatest Songs of All Time in 2013.

Chart performance
"Break My Stride" was very successful on the charts on several continents, peaking at number-one in Austria and New Zealand. It managed to climb into
the Top 10 also in Australia, where it hit number 2, Czech Republic, Denmark, and Ireland. On the Eurochart Hot 100, it went to number 33 in September 1996. "Break My Stride" was also a big hit in Israel, where it peaked at number 6 and in Canada, it reached number 18 on the RPM Singles Chart and number 19 on the RPM Dance Chart. The single was awarded with a platinum record in Australia and Austria, with a sale of 70,000 and 30,000 units. In 2002, a new remix of the song peaked at number 55 in Austria.

Track listings

CD maxi
 "Break My Stride" (FM Track) — 3:16
 "Break My Stride" (Prolongation) — 4:57
 "Break My Stride" (Native Track) — 5:14

CD maxi — The Remixes
 "Break My Stride" (Marc McCan Edit) — 5:38
 "Break My Stride" (Next Level Edit) — 4:37
 "Break My Stride" (Radio Edit) — 3:16

CD maxi — Re-Work 2002
 "Break My Stride" (Panamericana Radio Edit) — 2:50
 "Break My Stride" (Extended Version) — 4:57
 "Break My Stride" (Big Club Mix) — 4:20
 "Break My Stride" (Original) — 3:16

Charts and certifications

Weekly charts

1 2002 remix

Year-end charts

Certifications

Blue Lagoon version

In 2004, "Break My Stride" was covered by German band Blue Lagoon and became a hit in several European countries, including Austria, Germany, Sweden and Denmark, where it reached the top ten.

Track listings
 CD single
 "Break My Stride" (radio edit) — 3:04
 "Break My Stride" (extended version) — 5:10
 "Love Is the Key" — 3:27

 CD maxi
 "Break My Stride" (radio edit) — 3:01
 "Break My Stride" (extended version) — 5:08
 "Love Is the Key" — 3:26
 "Break My Stride" (a capella reprise) — 1:05
 "Break My Stride" (video)

Charts and certifications

Weekly charts

Year-end charts

Certifications

In popular culture
The song serves as the closing credits music for the 2011 film Cedar Rapids. It was featured in a 2012 television commercial for State Insurance of New Zealand. In 2019, it was featured in a U.S. television commercial for Santander Bank.  

The song gained more notoriety in 2020 on TikTok, as it was frequently used in TikTok videos – where users would text their friends the lyrics of the song. Matthew Wilder was thrilled at these memes, saying that the results are often bizarre but hilarious. Afterwards, Wilder posted an official lyric video that featured text messages of the song's lyrics.

References

1983 songs
1983 singles
1984 singles
1996 singles
1997 singles
2004 singles
2005 singles
Blue Lagoon (band) songs
Matthew Wilder songs
Number-one singles in Austria
Number-one singles in New Zealand
Number-one singles in Norway
Unique II songs
Songs written by Matthew Wilder
Columbia Records singles
Dance Pool singles
Sony Music singles
Universal Music Group singles
Internet memes introduced in 2020